Tiffany Midge (born July 2, 1965) is a Native American poet, editor, and author, who is a Hunkpapa Lakota enrolled member of the Standing Rock Sioux.

Early life and education
Midge was born to mother Alita Rose and father Herman Lloyd. Midge's mother worked as a civil servant for King County and her father was a teacher. Midge's mother was Lakota Sioux and grew up on a reservation in eastern Montana. Midge's father was raised on a farm in Montana. His family was from Germany, but were originally from Russia near the Valga River.

Midge grew up in the Pacific Northwest. For part of her childhood she lived in Snoqualmie Valley in Washington (state). She has an older half-sister named Julie.

In 2008, Midge received an MFA in creative writing from the University of Idaho.

Career
Midge's poetry is noted for its depiction of a self divided by differing identities, and for a strong streak of humor.

In 2002, Finnish composer Seppo Pohjola commissioned Midge's work into a performance called Cedars for a choral ensemble that was produced at Red Eagle Soaring Native Youth Theater in Seattle. In 2015, Cedars was produced by the Mirage Theatre Company at La MaMa in New York City. The work is a mixture of poetry and prose set to music. The newer version incorporates work by many Native American writers who in addition to Midge include Alex Jacobs, Arthur Tulee, Deborah A. Miranda, Evan Pritchard, Gail Tremblay, Joseph Bruchac, Martha Brice, Molly McGlennen, and William Michael Paul.

Midge was a humor columnist for Indian Country Media Network's Indian Country Today.

In 2019, Midge published a memoir called Bury My Heart at Chuck E. Cheese's from University of Nebraska Press. Cleveland Review of Books said the novel's "embrace of grief allows for an expansive range of humor that includes satire, dry wit, Twitter, and inside jokes not here for white consumption."

Midge's poetry, fiction, and creative nonfiction has appeared in McSweeney's, The Toast Butter Blog, Waxwing, Moss, Okey-Pankey, Mud City, Apex, The Rumpus, Yellow Medicine Review, The Raven Chronicles, North American Review and World Literature Today, and has been widely anthologized.

Teaching
Midge was a professor at Northwest Indian College, where she taught writing and composition.

In Spring 2019, she was the Simons Public Humanities fellow for University of Kansas Hall Center for the Humanities.

Honors and awards
 2017: National Cowboy and Western Heritage Museum, Western Heritage Award for Poetry Book for The Woman Who Married A Bear
 2015–18: Moscow, Idaho Poet Laureate
 2017: Kenyon Review Earthworks Prize for Indigenous Poetry for The Woman Who Married A Bear
 1994: Native Writers' Circle of the Americas, Diane Decorah Poetry Award/First Book Awards for Poetry for Outlaws, Renegades and Saints: Diary of a Mixed-Up Halfbreed

Personal life
Midge lives in Moscow, Idaho, which she refers to as Nez Perce country, as well as Seattle, Washington.

Selected works and publications

Books
 
 
 
 
 
 
 
  – forthcoming

Anthologies

Other work

References

Further reading

External links
 
 
 Tiffany Midge at Hanksville

Living people
Native American academics
Native American women academics
American women academics
Native American poets
American women poets
1965 births
Native American women writers
20th-century Native American women
20th-century Native Americans
21st-century Native Americans
20th-century American poets
21st-century American poets
20th-century American women writers
21st-century American women writers
Standing Rock Sioux people